XHPEEN-FM is a noncommercial radio station on 102.3 FM in Sabinas, Coahuila. It is known as Espacio 102.3 and carries a cultural format.

History
On June 10, 2013, Fundación de la Radio Cultural, A.C., applied for a new permit FM station at Sabinas. The application along with two others by FRC for new social stations in Coahuila was approved by the Federal Telecommunications Institute on November 28, 2018. XHPEEN-FM was the first of the four new Espacio stations to begin broadcasting, doing so on October 8, 2019.

References

Radio stations in Coahuila
2019 establishments in Mexico
Radio stations established in 2019